Elisabeth Stiepl (born 1920) is an Austrian former film and television actress. As a character actress, she appeared in more than ninety film and TV productions during her career in small or supporting parts.

Selected filmography
 Das Licht der Liebe (1954)
 The Song of Kaprun (1955)
 Scandal in Bad Ischl (1957)
 The Priest and the Girl (1958)
 Herr Puntila and His Servant Matti (1960)
 My Niece Doesn't Do That (1960)
 Mariandl (1961)
 The Adventures of Count Bobby (1961)
 The Sweet Life of Count Bobby (1962)
 An Alibi for Death (1963)
 Our Crazy Nieces (1963)
 Help, My Bride Steals (1964)
 In Bed by Eight (1965)
 Call of the Forest (1965)
 The Murderer with the Silk Scarf (1966)
 Frau Wirtin treibt es jetzt noch toller (1970)
 The Reverend Turns a Blind Eye (1971)
 Und Jimmy ging zum Regenbogen (1971)
 Love Hotel in Tyrol (1978)

References

Bibliography 
Peter Cowie. Variety International Film Guide. Tantivy Press, 1984.

External links 
 

1920 births
Possibly living people
Austrian film actresses
Austrian television actresses